The 1999 Taça de Portugal Final was the final match of the 1998–99 Taça de Portugal, the 59th season of the Taça de Portugal, the premier Portuguese football cup competition organized by the Portuguese Football Federation (FPF). The match was played on 19 June 1999 at the Estádio Nacional in Oeiras, and opposed two Primeira Liga sides Beira-Mar and Campomaiorense. Beira-Mar defeated Campomaiorense 1–0 to claim the Taça de Portugal for the first time in their history. In Portugal, the final was televised live on RTP África, RTP Internacional, Sport TV and TVI.

As a result of Beira-Mar winning the Taça de Portugal, the Auri-negros qualified for the 1999 Supertaça Cândido de Oliveira where they took on 1998–99 Primeira Divisão winners Porto.

Match

Details

References

1999
1998–99 in Portuguese football
S.C. Beira-Mar matches
S.C. Campomaiorense matches
June 1999 sports events in Europe